Shihab al-Din Abd al-Halim ibn Taymiyyah (1230 - 1284) was Muslim scholar muhaddith, theologian, judge, jurisconsult. He was father of Ibn Taymiyyah.

Biography
Shihab al-Din ibn Taymiyyah had the Hanbali chair in Harran and later at the Umayyad Mosque. Harran was a city part of the Sultanate of Rum, now Harran is a small city on the border of Syria and Turkey, currently in Şanlıurfa province. At the beginning of the Islamic period, Harran was located in the land of the Mudar tribe (Diyar Mudar). His father, Abu al-Barkat Majd ad-Din ibn Taymiyyah al-Hanbali and his brother, Fakhr al-Din (d. 1225) were reputable scholars of the Hanbali school of law.

Shihab al-Din left with his family from Harran to Damascus in 667 AH due to the Tatars taking over it. He learnt at the Damascus Mosque and took over the sheikhdom of Dar al-Hadith al-Sukari in al-Qasayn, where he was his residence. Then his son Sheikh Taqi al-Din studied it after him. He died on the 27th of Dhu al-Hijjah 682 AH.

References

1230 births
1284 deaths
13th-century Muslim scholars of Islam
Atharis
Hanbalis
Scholars from the Mamluk Sultanate
Ibn Taymiyyah family